Denis Ivanov may refer to:
 Denis Ivanov (footballer)
 Denis Ivanov (filmmaker)